The Arabian Gulf Cup "stampede" was an crowd crush that took place on 19 January 2023 outside the Basra International Stadium in the Iraqi city of Basra, ahead of the 25th Arabian Gulf Cup final between Iraq and Oman. Up to four people died and up to 60 were injured in the crush. The families of the dead blamed inadequate crowd control and ticketless fans for the death and injuries. The stadium security staff blamed ticketless fans.

Background
The final match of the 25th Arabian Gulf Cup, between Iraq and Oman, was to be played at the Basra stadium. This was the first time that the tournament was being held in Iraq since 1979. In a statement before the game, Iraq's Ministry of Interior encouraged anyone who did not have tickets to the final to leave the area around the stadium. It stated that the stadium was completely full and that all gates had been closed.

Events
On January 19, 2023, between one and four people were killed when thousands of fans without tickets waited outside Basra International Stadium since daybreak in the hopes of viewing the rare home international final, resulting in a crush as crowds attempted to enter the stadium. Despite the crush, the Arabian Gulf Cup final match went ahead as planned, and Iraq won the eight-nation event by defeating Oman 3–2 after extra time.

See also

 
2005 Al-Aimmah Bridge disaster
Karbala stampede
Hillsborough disaster
Oppenheimer Stadium disaster
Ellis Park Stadium disaster
Accra Sports Stadium disaster
Heysel Stadium disaster

References

2023 disasters in Iraq
January 2023 events in Iraq
Stadium disasters
History of football in Iraq
Human stampedes in Iraq
Fatal accident inquiries
History of Basra
Crowd collapses and crushes